Apotomops texasana is a species of moth of the family Tortricidae. It is found in Arizona and Texas in the United States.

The wingspan is about 15 mm.

References

Moths described in 1984
Euliini
Moths of North America